Bratsch may refer to:

Gampel-Bratsch, municipality in the district of Leuk in the canton of Valais in Switzerland
Bratsch, village in Gampel-Bratsch in the district of Leuk of the canton of Valais in Switzerland
Bratsch (band), French-based music ensemble using various influences
Czech version of the balkan tambura

See also
Bratsche, German for viola, from the Italian "viola da braccio"
Bratschen, a German term, weathering products that occur as a result of frost and aeolian corrasion almost exclusively on the calc-schists of the Upper Slate Mantle (Obere Schieferhülle) in the High Tauern mountains of Austria
Hinterer Bratschenkopf, mountain in the Glockner Group on the Fusch-Kaprun ridge (Fuscher / Kapruner Kamm) in the High Tauern, a high mountain range in the Austrian Central Alps 
Bratschenköpfe, two peaks in the Berchtesgaden Alps